Merle Ginsberg is a fashion editor, blogger and television personality. She served as a judge on the first and second seasons of RuPaul's Drag Race (2009/2010) and also appeared on Bravo's Launch My Line (2009) as a contestant, finishing as the runner-up.

Furthermore, Ginsberg is known for co-writing Paris Hilton's New York Times bestseller Confessions of an Heiress: A Tongue-in-Chic Peek Behind the Pose, which was published in May 2004.

References

External links
 Merle Ginsberg at IMDb

Living people
American women writers
Participants in American reality television series
Year of birth missing (living people)
Judges in American reality television series